U of O may refer to:

Canada
 University of Ottawa, Ottawa, Ontario

United States
 University of Ohio, Athens, Ohio
 University of Oklahoma, Norman, Oklahoma
 University of Oregon, Eugene, Oregon
 University of the Ozarks, Clarksville, Arkansas

See also
 UO (disambiguation)